Path of Totality is the second full-length studio album from American metal band Tombs. It was released on June 7, 2011 through Relapse Records in CD, LP and digital download formats. It is the group's first album to be recorded by John Congleton.

According to Mike Hill, the album title is a reference to the channel of darkness, or shadow, that is cast upon the earth in the moment when the moon obscures the sun during a solar eclipse. Concerning the lyrics, Mike Hill commented: "The lyrics are less personal, in that they have nothing to do with my personal experiences or any kind of internal narrative. The new record deals more with reflections on death, endings and the sort of existential cynicism that can easily creep into your consciousness living in a world where there seems be an incredible level of detachment."

Decibel Magazine ranked Path of Totality number one in their Top 40 Extreme Albums of 2011 list.

Track listing

Personnel
Path of Totality album personnel adapted from the CD liner notes

Tombs
 Mike Hill - vocals, guitar
 Carson Daniel James - bass
 Andrew Hernandez II - drums, percussion
Additional musicians
 Bryant Clifford Meyer - synthesizer, keyboard on "Black Hole of Summer", "Angel of Destruction" & "Black Heaven"
 The Champ Morgan - back up vocals on "Vermillion", "Path of Totality" & "Angel of Destruction"
Production
 Alan Douches - mastering
 John Congleton - mixing, recording
Art
 Thomas Hooper and Mike Hill - concept and layout 
 Thomas Hooper - art and illustration
 Jacob Speis - design

References

External links

 2011 NPR interview with Mike Hill

2011 albums
Relapse Records albums
Tombs (band) albums